Haas, also de Haas, is a German and Dutch surname, also Jewish (Ashkenazic), usually from Hase or de Haas, the German and Dutch words for "hare". Notable people with the surname include the following:

 Andreas Haas (born 1982), German footballer
 Arthur Erich Haas (1884–1941), Austrian physicist
 Barbara Haas (born 1996), Austrian tennis player
 Bernt Haas (born 1978), Austrian footballer
 Bill Haas (born 1982), American golfer
 Bob Haas (born 1942), former chairman of Levi Strauss & Co.
 Brittany Haas (born 1987), American Fiddler
 Carl Haas (1929–2016), American auto racing impresario
 Charles F. Haas (1913–2011), American film and television director
 Charles S. Haas (born 1952), American screenwriter and actor
 Charlie Haas (born 1972), American professional wrestler
 Christian Haas (born 1958), German sprinter
 Chrislo Haas (1956–2004), German musician
 Christl Haas (1943–2001), Austrian Olympic skiing champion
 Clark Haas (1919–1978), American cartoonist
 Conrad Haas (1509–1576), Austrian military engineer
 Daniel Haas (born 1983), German footballer
 Darius de Haas (born 1968), American stage actor and singer
 David Haas (born 1957), American author and composer of liturgical music
 Dolly Haas (1910–1994), German-American actress
 Earle Haas (1888–1981), inventor of the modern menstrual tampon
 Eddie Haas (born 1935), American baseball outfielder and manager
 Eduard Haas (1897–1989), Austrian inventor of Pez candy
 Ernst Haas (1921–1986), Austrian photographer and photojournalist
 Ernst B. Haas (1924–2003), American political scientist
 Felix Haas, German investor
 Frank Joseph Haas, former Grand Master of the Grand Lodge of West Virginia
 Fred Haas (1916–2004), American golfer
 Fritz Haas (zoologist) (1886–1969)
 Geertruida de Haas-Lorentz (1885–1973), Dutch physicist
 Gene Haas (born 1952), American machine tool manufacturer
 Georg Haas (physician) (1886–1971), German medical doctor
 Georg Friedrich Haas (born 1953), Austrian composer
 Hans Haas (1886–1935), German Protestant theologian
 Harald Haas, Professor of Mobile Communications, University of Edinburgh
 Helmut Haas (fl. 1949), discoverer of the Haas effect, a psychoacoustic effect
 Hildegarde Haas (1926–2002), German-born American artist
 Hugo Haas (1901–1968), Czech film actor and director
 Isaac Haas (born 1995), American basketball player
 Jacob de Haas (1872–1937), UK journalist and an early leader of the Zionist movement
 Jay Haas (born 1953), American professional golfer
 Josef Haas (born 1937), Swiss cross country skier
 Joseph Haas (1879–1960), German composer
 Karen L. Haas, American government administrator and lobbyist
 Karl Haas (1913–2005), American classical music radio show host
 Leonard Haas, Wisconsin politician and President of UW-Eau Claire
 Lisbeth Haas, American historian and anthropologist
 Lukas Haas (born 1976), American film actor
 Luke Haas (1949-2015) Luxembourgian rock musician and comic artist
 Mario Haas (born 1974), Austrian footballer
 Mary Haas (1910–1996), American linguist
 Mauritz de Haas (1832–1895), Dutch-American marine painter
 Maximilian Haas (born 1985), German footballer
 Michael Haas, there are several persons of this name including a renowned lab technician 
 Mimi Haas, American billionaire businesswoman
 Monique Haas (1909–1987), French pianist
 Moose Haas (born 1956), American baseball player
 Mule Haas (1903–1974), American baseball player
 Nathan Haas (born 1989), Australian cyclist
 Nico de Haas (1907–ca. 2000), Dutch National-Socialist editor, photographer, and artist
 Pavel Haas (1899–1944), Czech Jewish composer
 Payne Haas (born 1999), Australian rugby league footballer
 Payton Haas (born 1979), American actor
 Peter E. Haas (1918–2005), American businessman
 Peter E. Haas Jr. (born 1948), American businessman and philanthropist.
 Peter M. Haas (born 1955), American political scientist
 Peter W. Haas (born 1964), Slovak fine art photographer
 Radek Haas (born 2000), Czech ice hockey goaltender
 Richard Haas (born 1936), American muralist
 Robert Haas (clergyman), 19th-century German Lutheran minister
 Robert Haas (musicologist) (1886–1960), Austrian musicologist
 Russ Haas (1974–2001), American professional wrestler
 Saskia Rao-de Haas, Dutch cellist of music from India
 Shira Haas (born 1995), Israeli actress
 Sidney V. Haas, M.D. (1870–1964), American pediatrician and originator of the Specific Carbohydrate Diet
 Thomas J. Haas, American university president
 Tiffany Haas (born c. 1983), American softball player
 Tiphaine Haas (born 1992), French actress
 Tommy Haas (born 1978), German tennis player
 Toxey Haas (born 1960), American businessman
 Wander Johannes de Haas (1878–1960), Dutch physicist and mathematician
 Walter A. Haas (1889–1979), American president and chairman of Levi Strauss & Co.
 Walter A. Haas, Jr. (1916–1995), American president and chairman of Levi Strauss & Co.
 Walter H. Haas, (1917-2015), American amateur astronomer, founder of the Association of Lunar and Planetary Observers (ALPO)
 Waltraut Haas (born 1927), Austrian actress and singer
 Werner Haas (1927–1956), German motorcycle racer
 Wolf Haas (born 1960), Austrian author
 Wolfgang Haas (born 1948), archbishop in Liechtenstein

See also 
 Haas (disambiguation)
 Hass (surname)

German-language surnames
Dutch-language surnames
Jewish surnames
Surnames from nicknames